The following is a list of Victoria Cross recipients during the Waziristan Campaign in north-west India (now Pakistan) during the 1920s.

Captain Ishar Singh
Ishar Singh (13 December 1895 – 2 December 1963).

Ishar Singh was 25 years old, and a Sepoy in the 28th Punjab Regiment, Indian Army during the Waziristan Campaign, when the following deed took place for which he was awarded the VC:

Lieutenant William David Kenny
William David Kenny.

Temporary Captain Henry John Andrews
Henry John Andrews (1871-22 October 1919).

Andrews served as a T/Captain in the Indian Medical Services. He was awarded his VC posthumously for service on 22 October 1919. He is buried at the Bannu Cemetery, Peshawar, Pakistan.

References

Lists of recipients of the Victoria Cross by conflict